Tangshan Teachers' College (唐山师范学院 Tángshān shīfàn xuéyuàn) is a college in Hebei, China under the provincial government.

Teachers colleges in China
Universities and colleges in Hebei